The Lapworth Medal is the highest award of the Palaeontological Association, given to those who have made a significant contribution to the science by means of a substantial body of research.

Recipients
Source:  Palaeontological Association
2020 - Prof. Andrew B. Smith
2019 - Prof. Derek E.G. Briggs, FRS
2018 - Prof. Derek J. Siveter
2017 - Prof. Stefan Bengtson
2016 - Dr Adrian William Amsler Rushton
2015 - Prof. Jennifer Clack FRS 
2014 - Prof. Richard A. Fortey, FRS
2013 - Prof. Dianne Edwards, FRS
2012 - Prof. Euan Clarkson
2011 - Prof. Richard Aldridge
2010 - Dr Robin Cocks
2009 - Prof. Bruce Runnegar
2008 - Prof. Charles Holland
2007 - Prof. Tony Hallam
2006 - Prof. Dolf Seilacher
2005 - Prof. William Chaloner FRS
2004 - Prof. James Valentine
2002 - Prof. Sir Alwyn Williams FRS
2000 - Prof. Harry B. Whittington FRS

See also

 List of paleontology awards

References

British science and technology awards
Paleontology awards
Awards established in 2000